The 1993–94 FIBA European Cup was the twenty-eighth edition of FIBA's 2nd-tier level European-wide professional club basketball competition. It occurred between September 4, 1993, and March 15, 1994.

First round

|}

Second round

|}

Third round
Wild card to participate in the European Cup for the Loser clubs* of the 1/16 finals of the 1993–94 FIBA European League.
*Canoe Jeans EBBC, Croatia Osiguranje, USK Praha, Hapoel Galil Elyon, UKJ SÜBA St. Pölten, Žalgiris, Levski Sofia, Rabotnički, ASK Brocēni, Fidefinanz Bellinzona and Smelt Olimpija.

|}

Automatically qualified to the group stage
 Smelt Olimpija

Quarterfinals group stage

Semifinals
Seeded teams played games 2 and 3 at home.

|}

Final
March 15, Centre Intercommunal de Glace Malley, Lausanne

|}

References

External links
1993–94 FIBA European Cup @ FIBA Europe.com
1993–94 FIBA European Cup @ linguasport.com

FIBA Saporta Cup
FIBA